María Antonia Martínez García (born 18 May 1953) is a Spanish politician and member of the Spanish Socialist Workers' Party (PSOE) from the Region of Murcia who served as the third President of the Region of Murcia from April 1993 to June 1995.

References

1953 births
Presidents of the Region of Murcia
Members of the Regional Assembly of Murcia
Politicians from the Region of Murcia
Spanish Socialist Workers' Party politicians
Living people